The Clearing is the first studio album from Sleep for Sleepers. It was released by Facedown Records on May 12, 2009.

Critical reception

Awarding the album three stars from AllMusic, Tim DiGravina states, "it's at least an upbeat, life-affirming listen while it lasts." Andy Shaw, rating the album a seven out of ten at Cross Rhythms, says, "Sleep For Sleepers, have not come up with something completely original but there is enough in it to make it register." Giving the album three and a half stars for Jesus Freak Hideout, writes, "With thoughtful, relationship-based lyrics and a guitar-heavy sound to back it, there is a lot to like about The Clearing." Timothy Estabrooks, awarding the album four stars by Jesus Freak Hideout, describes, "The Clearing is a beautiful ride." Rating the album four stars from Indie Vision Music, Scott.L states, it "is pretty much a gimme if you're into mellow indie rock with some great pop sensibilities thrown in at times." Brian Morrissette, giving the album an eight out of ten from Christ Core, writes, "The Clearing is a diamond in the ruff".

Track listing

References

2009 debut albums
Sleep for Sleepers albums
Facedown Records albums